Luminous is an album by pianist John Hicks and flautist Elise Wood.

Recording and music
The first recording session was on July 31, 1985, in New York City. In addition to John Hicks on piano and Elise Wood on flute, bassist Walter Booker and drummer Jimmy Cobb played on three tracks, and tenor saxophonist Clifford Jordan played on two. For the second session, in the same city in September 1988, Booker and drummer Alvin Queen played on two tracks. On the tracks, Hicks "has a reflective, lyrical bent".

Releases
The album was originally released by Nilva Records. It was reissued by Evidence Music, with four bonus tracks from the two original recording sessions added.

Reception
The Penguin Guide to Jazz commented that the album was "Attractive but disconcertingly low-key".

Track listing

Original release
"Luminous"
"Yemenja"
"Ojos De Rojo"
"Blue in Green"
"Motivation"
"Expectation"
"Chelsea Bridge"

Reissue
For the reissue, four tracks were added to the seven on the original album:

"Osaka"
"I'm Getting Sentimental Over You"
"Upper Manhattan Medical Group"
"Once in a While"

Personnel
John Hicks – piano
Elise Wood – flute
Clifford Jordan – tenor sax (tracks 1, 2, 8)
Walter Booker – bass (tracks 1–3, 5, 6, 8, 9, 11)
Jimmy Cobb – drums (tracks 1–3, 8, 9)
Alvin Queen – drums (tracks 5, 6)

References

John Hicks (jazz pianist) albums